KBIK (102.9 FM) is a radio station licensed in Independence, Kansas. It broadcasts country music. The station is owned by My Town Media, Inc.

Previous logo

External links
 Indy 102.9 website
 

BIK
Radio stations established in 1993
1993 establishments in Kansas
Independence, Kansas
Country radio stations in the United States